Wendell Holmes Stephenson (March 13, 1899 - April 14, 1970) was an American professor of history. He edited historical journals. Duke University has a collection of his papers.

Stephenson grew up in Cartersburg, Indiana and Plainfield, Indiana. He was a public school teacher from 1917 until 1921. He received an A.B. degree from Indiana University in 1923, an A.M. form Indiana University in 1924	

He was an instructor and assistant professor of history and political science at University of Kentucky
from 1927 until 1945. He became Associate professor of American history at Louisiana State University in 1928. He received a Ph.D. from the University of Michigan.

He edited the Journal of Southern History from 1935 until 1941 or 1940 to 1941. He was a resident of the Agricultural History Society from 1941 to 1944. He became dean of the College of Arts and Sciences at Louisiana State University and was president of the Southern Historical Association in 1944. From 1946 to 1953, he was	Professor of Southern history and chairman of the Division of Social Sciences at Tulane University. He served as Managing editor of the Mississippi Valley Historical Review from 1953 to 1970. He was a professor of history at the University of Oregon from 1957 to 1958. He was president of the Mississippi Valley Historical Association in 1970. He died in Eugene, Oregon.

Bibliography
Publications of the Kansas State Historical Society, Embracing The Political Career of General James H. Lane, Kansas State Historical Society, 1930
The political career of General James H. Lane 
Alexander Porter: Whig Planter of Old Louisiana, Louisiana State University Press, 1934
Isaac Franklin, Slave Trader and Planter of the Old South: With Plantation Records, Louisiana State University Press, 1938
The South Lives in History: Southern Historians and Their Legacy, Louisiana State University Press, Baton Rouge, 1955
A basic history of the Old South 1959
Southern History in the Making: Pioneer Historians of the South

References

20th-century American historians
American male non-fiction writers

1899 births
1970 deaths
20th-century American male writers
Indiana University alumni
University of Michigan alumni
University of Kentucky faculty
Louisiana State University faculty